Twerps was an Australian indie pop band, formed in Melbourne in 2008.

History
Twerps formed in late 2008 as a "creative outgrowth" of Martin Frawley and Julia MacFarlane's relationship. The band developed a jangly pop sound similar to that of Dick Diver and other contemporaries in the Melbourne indie scene, which subsequently became known as dolewave. Within months of forming, Twerps had already supported international touring groups such as Deerhunter, Yo La Tengo and Oh Sees.

Released by Chapter Music in 2011, the band's self-titled debut LP was favourably received by critics, earning a 7.9 from Pitchfork, which stated that the album is characterised by "excellent melodies, simple guitar lines, and simple lyrics that imply something urgent or devastating". Pitchfork also named the album's closer "Coast to Coast" as a Best New Track, making Twerps the third Australian band to earn the award after Cut Copy and Tame Impala.

In the lead-up to the release of their sophomore LP Range Anxiety, the band recruited Angus Lord and Alex MacFarlane from dolewave band the Stevens, who joined as replacements on bass and drums, respectively. The album led to an international tour and various festival appearances.

Twerps played their final show in November 2017 and released their last song, "It's Time", the following year. They quietly disbanded soon after. Despite breaking up, Frawley is hopeful of a reunion at some point, stating, "One of my favourite records by The Go-Betweens is The Friends of Rachel Worth, which is their comeback ... I want to make music with Jules again [someday]".

Members
 Martin Frawley – vocals, guitar (2008–2018)
 Julia MacFarlane – vocals, guitar (2008–2018)
 Rick Milovanovic – bass guitar (2008–2013)
 Patrick O'Neill – drums (2008–2013)
 Angus Lord – bass guitar (2013–2018)
 Alex MacFarlane – drums (2013–2018)
 Jazper Doak Stride – dancing (2018–current)

Discography

Albums

Extended plays

Awards and nominations

EG Awards / Music Victoria Awards
The EG Awards (known as Music Victoria Awards since 2013) are an annual awards night celebrating Victorian music. They commenced in 2006.

|-
|rowspan="4"| EG Awards of 2012
| Twerps
| Best Album
| 
|-
| "Dreamin'"
| Best Song
| 
|-
| Twerps
| Best Band
| 
|-
| Twerps
| Outstanding Achievement By a Victorian Artist
| 
|-
| Music Victoria Awards of 2015
| Twerps
| Best Band
| 
|-

References

External links
Twerps at Chapter Music

Musical groups from Melbourne
Musical groups established in 2008
Musical groups disestablished in 2018